Cyprus participated in the Eurovision Song Contest 2004 with the song "Stronger Every Minute" performed by Lisa Andreas. The song was written by Mike Connaris, who had twice written a runner up in Eurovision selection process for the United Kingdom.

The Cypriot entry for the 2004 contest in Istanbul, Turkey was decided on 17 February 2004, through a 10-song national final organised by the Cyprus Broadcasting Corporation (CyBC). To promote the entry, the song was released as a CD single and Andreas performed the song alongside other Eurovision entrants of the year at a show in London.

Cyprus was drawn to compete 14th in the contest's semi-final, held on 12 May 2004 and placed fifth, qualifying for the 15 May final. At the final, the nation's entry was performed 21st on the night and placed fifth out of the 24 competing entries with 170 points.

Background

Cyprus' least successful result was in  when it placed last with the song "Tora zo" by Elpida, receiving only four points in total.

Before Eurovision

National final 
The Cypriot broadcaster opted to hold a national final to select the nation's entry for the Eurovision Song Contest 2004. Artists and composers were able to submit their entries to the broadcaster between 15 October 2003 and 2 January 2004. All artists and composers were required to have Cypriot nationality. At the conclusion of the deadline, 62 entries were received by CyBC. Ten entries were then selected by a five-member selection committee and announced on 7 February 2004. All competing entries were English-language songs.

The national final took place on 17 February 2004 at the Pavilion Night Club in Nicosia, hosted by Loukas Hamatsos. In addition to the performances of the competing entries, the show featured guest performances by 2004 Israeli Eurovision entrant David D'Or and 2004 Lithuanian Eurovision entrants Linas and Simona. "Stronger Every Minute", a power ballad performed by Lisa Andreas, was selected by a combination of votes from public televoting (60%) and jury panel (40%). Andreas, then sixteen years old at the time, was the youngest participant to take part in the 2004 contest. Born in Gillingham in the United Kingdom, her mother hailed from Cyprus. "Stronger Every Minute" was written by Mike Connaris, who had twice written a runner up in Eurovision selection processes for the United Kingdom. While the song initially contained lyrics in Greek, it was decided by the Cypriot delegation to have the song performed only in English at Eurovision.

Promotion

To promote the entry, the song was released as a CD single. Andreas also performed "Stronger Every Minute" on Popshow for a Eurovision Party at CC club in London alongside Eurovision participants of the past and present.

At Eurovision 

The Eurovision Song Contest 2004 took place at Abdi İpekçi Arena in Istanbul, Turkey, and consisted of a semi-final on 12 May and the final on 15 May 2004. For the first time, a semi-final round was introduced to accommodate the influx of nations that wanted to compete in the contest. As Cyprus had not finished in the top 11 at the 2003 Contest the previous year, its song had to compete in the semi-final. Cyprus was set to compete in the semi-final of the Eurovision Song Contest 2004 fourteenth, following  and preceding .

Performances
The Cypriot performance saw Andreas on stage alone with no backing vocalists or dancers. Cyprus qualified to the final, placing fifth in the semi-final and scoring 149 points. In the final, the country performed 21st, following the United Kingdom and preceding Turkey and placed fifth, scoring 170 points. This placement allowed Cyprus to automatically qualify for the final of the next year's contest.

Voting 

Below is a breakdown of points awarded to Cyprus in the semi-final and final of the Eurovision Song Contest 2004, as well as by the nation on both occasions. Voting during the two shows involved each country awarding a set of points from 1–8, 10 and 12 based on results from their respective public televote. In the semi-final, Cyprus placed fifth with a total of 149 points, including the top 12 points from Greece and Monaco. In the final, the nation's 170 points included 12 points from Greece. Of the 35 other countries competing, all but three awarded points to "Stronger Every Minute". For both the semi-final and final, Cyprus awarded its 12 points to Greece.

Points awarded to Cyprus

Points awarded by Cyprus

References

Bibliography 

 

2004
Countries in the Eurovision Song Contest 2004
Eurovision